Local elections will be held in the Province of Rizal on May 13, 2019 as part of the 2019 general election. Voters will select candidates for all local positions: a municipal/city mayor, vice mayor and town councilors, as well as members of the Sangguniang Panlalawigan, the governor, vice-governor and representatives for the two districts of Rizal.

Gubernatorial Election Results
Incumbent Governor Rebecca A. Ynares is running for reelection.

Vice Gubernatorial Election Results
Vice Governor Reynaldo San Juan, Jr. is running for reelection unopposed.

Congressional Election Results

First District
Rep. Michael John "Jack" Duavit was re-elected.

Second District
Rep. Juan Fidel Felipe Nograles defeated Ma. Lourdes "Maridee" Rodriguez, wife of former Rep. Isidro Rodriguez Jr.

Antipolo

1st District
Former Rep. Roberto "Robbie" Puno, husband of Rep. Chiqui Roa-Puno, was elected successfully.

2nd District
Resureccion Acop, wife of Rep. Romeo "Romy" Acop, elected unopposed.

Provincial Board Election Results
All 2 Districts of Rizal and all 2 districts of Antipolo will elect members of the Rizal Provincial Board.

First District
Municipalities: Angono, Binangonan, Cainta, Taytay
All board members was re-elected.

Second District
Municipalities: Baras, Cardona, Jala-Jala, Morong, Pililla, Rodriguez (Montalban), San Mateo, Tanay, Teresa
All board members were re-elected, except for Olivia De Leon who ran and elected as mayor of Morong. She was replaced by former Board Member Emigdio "Dino" Tanjuatco III.

Antipolo's 1st District
Roberto Andres "Randy" Puno Jr., son of former Rep. Roberto "Robbie" Puno and Rep. Chiqui Roa-Puno was elected unopposed.

Antipolo's 2nd District
Joel Huertas is term-limited and is running for councilor of the said district. Former councilor Alexander Marquez will run in his stead and will be challenged by Edelberto Coronado.

City and Municipality Elections
All municipalities and City of Antipolo in Rizal will elect mayor and vice-mayor this election. The candidates for mayor and vice mayor with the highest number of votes wins the seat; they are voted separately, therefore, they may be of different parties when elected. Below is the list of mayoralty and vice-mayoralty candidates of each city and municipalities per district.

1st District
Municipalities: Angono, Binangonan, Cainta, Taytay

Angono
Mayor Gerry Calderon is term limited. His party nominee, his daughter, incumbent Councilor Jeri Mae Calderon defeated Vice Mayor Antonio "Sonny" Rubin.

Mayor Gerardo "Gerry" Calderon defeated his brother, former Brgy. Captain Jose "Joey" Calderon.

Binangonan
Mayor Cesar Ynares won unopposed.

Vice Mayor Cecilio "Boyet" Ynares was re-elected.

Cainta
Mayor Johnielle Keith Nieto defeated Vice Mayor Sofia Velasco

Councilor Ace Servillon defeated actor Gary Estrada.

Taytay
George Ricardo Gacula is the incumbent.

Vice Mayor Carlito Gonzaga is running for mayor. His party's nominee is Jan Victor Cabitac.

2nd District
Municipalities: Baras, Cardona, Jala-Jala, Morong, Pililla, Rodriguez (Montalban), San Mateo, Tanay, Teresa

Baras
Katherine Robles is the incumbent.

Willfredo Robles is the incumbent.

Cardona

Jala-Jala

Morong

Pililla

Rodriguez (Montalban)
Cecilio Hernandez is term-limited and is running for vice mayor.

San Mateo
Cristina Diaz is the incumbent.

Tanay

Teresa
Raul Palino is the incumbent.

Antipolo
Casimiro "Jun" Ynares III is not running. His wife Andrea is his party's nominee and is running unopposed.

References

2019 Philippine local elections
Elections in Rizal
May 2019 events in the Philippines
2019 elections in Calabarzon